Şeyhülislâm Halidefendizâde Mehmet Cemaleddin Efendi (1848–1917) was a senior judge of the Ottoman Empire, and served as sheikh al-Islam for Sultan Abdul Hamid II between 1891 and 1909.

Biography 

His father, Sheikh Yusufzâde Hâlid Efendi, was a member of the judiciary and served as Kazasker and as a minister. His mother was a member of the Kevabibiye family and a daughter of Mehmed Said Efendi. 

Mehmet Cemaleddin was educated in Ottoman and Islamic law, and served in the Ottoman judiciary as Kadi (Chief Judge) of Constantinople in 1884. He was appointed Chief Judge of Anatolia (Anadolu Kazaskeri) in 1888 and Chief Judge of Rumelia, the European parts of the Ottoman Empire in the Balkans, in 1890. On 4 September 1891, at the age of 43, he was appointed Şeyhülislam, the Cabinet Minister in charge of religious and legal matters. He remained in this post for 16 years and 11 months, and was later reappointed on three other occasions for shorter periods, holding this post for a total of nearly 18 years, and becoming the second-longest holder of this post in Ottoman history, after Zembilli Ali Efendi. His wife was Fatma Zehra Hanim, and his son-in-law was the leading Turkish surgeon and mayor of Constantinople Prof. Cemil Topuzlu, also known as Cemil Pasha, for whom a major boulevard in modern Istanbul "Cemil Topuzlu Caddesi" and a municipal amphitheatre Cemil Topuzlu Harbiye Amphitheatre are named. Mehmet Cemaleddin's younger brother Ibrahim Sami Bey, was a member of the Ottoman Council of State or Şura-yı Devlet whose grandson Erol Gelenbe held the ``Dennis Gabor Chair (2003-2019) at Imperial College, London.

An opponent of the pro-German and war-oriented policy of the Union and Progress Party, Mehmed Cemalettin Efendi was exiled to Egypt in 1913, and died in a place called Ramleh near Menouf in Egypt, on 5 April 1917, at the age of 70. When his body was brought to Constantinople, it lay in state at the Topkapı Palace, and he is now buried at the Edirnekapı Martyr's Cemetery (Turkish: Edirnekapı Şehitliği). His memoirs were first published in Constantinople in 1920, and then edited by Selim Kutsan and re-published in modern Turkish under the title Siyasi Hatiralarim (My Political Memoirs), by the publisher Nehir Yayinlari (Istanbul) in 1990.

 Selected bibliography 

 Cemaleddin Efendi "Siyasi Hatiralarim" from the Ottoman Turkish original, "Hatirat-i Siyasisi''", Istanbul 1920, Selim Kutsan (ed.), Publisher, Nehir Yayinlari: 43, Hatiralarla Yakin Tarih Dizisi: 4, Istanbul, 1990.

Notes and references

1848 births
1917 deaths
Turkish judges
19th-century people from the Ottoman Empire
Sheikh-ul-Islams of the Ottoman Empire
Members of the Senate of the Ottoman Empire
Islamic scholars from the Ottoman Empire
Shaykh al-Islāms